Rolled Stockings (1927) is a silent film comedy produced and distributed by Paramount Pictures, directed by Richard Rosson, and starring Louise Brooks.

Preservation status
The film is considered a lost film.

Cast
James Hall - Jim Treadway
Louise Brooks - Carol Fleming
Richard Arlen - Ralph Treadway
Nancy Phillips - The Vamp
El Brendel - Rudolph
David Torrence - Mr. Treadway
Chance Ward - the coach

References

External links
Rolled Stockings at IMDb.com
allmovie.com/ synopsis
lobby poster advertisement

1927 films
1927 comedy films
American black-and-white films
Silent American comedy films
American silent feature films
Films set in universities and colleges
Lost American films
Paramount Pictures films
Rowing films
Films directed by Richard Rosson
1920s American films